Birgit Schreiber is a former East German cross-country skier who competed from 1978 to 1980. She won a silver medal in the 4 × 5 km at the 1978 FIS Nordic World Ski Championships in Lahti.

External links
World Championship results 

German female cross-country skiers
Living people
FIS Nordic World Ski Championships medalists in cross-country skiing
Year of birth missing (living people)